Anna-Greta Leijon (born Anna Margareta Maria Lejon, 30 June 1939) is a Swedish former social democratic politician. She held various ministerial posts one of which was the minister for justice although she does not have any degree in law.

Early life and career
Leijon was born on 30 June 1939 in Stockholm, Sweden. She was employed at the Swedish Labour Market Administration (Arbetsmarknadsstyrelsen) in 1964 and became agency director there in 1970. Leijon was minister without portfolio from 1973 to 1976 and member of the Riksdag (s) from 1974 to 1990 (vice chairman of the Committee on the Labour Market from 1979 to 1982). She was a member of the Executive Committee of the Social Democratic Party Board from 1981, minister for employment from 1982 to 1987, minister for gender equality in 1986 and minister for justice from 1987 to 1988 when she was forced to step down due to the Ebbe Carlsson affair. Leijon was chairman of the Committee on Finance from 1988 to 1990.

Kidnapping plans
Following the 1975 West German Embassy siege in Stockholm, the German Red Army Faction (RAF) terrorist Norbert Kröcher allegedly planned to kidnap Anna-Greta Leijon. The goal was to exchange Leijon for 8 of his comrades held in German prisons. The plan, known as Operation Leo, was intercepted by the Swedish Security Service (Säpo) and Kröcher was arrested on 31 March in Stockholm. He was deported from Sweden in 1977 and jailed in Germany. He was released in 1989 and did not rejoin the RAF. Leijon was chosen as the kidnapping victim because she had the responsibility for the terrorist legislation and was ultimately responsible for the expulsion of the RAF terrorists who carried out the embassy siege.

Other work
She became the president of International Labour Organization in 1984 and she has been chairman of Social Science Research Council (Socialvetenskapliga forskningsrådet).

Later career
After her time as politician Anna-Greta Leijon had several public assignments, including as chairman of the Sveriges Television (SVT) from 1995 to 2005. In 1995, she succeeded Hans Alfredson as head of Skansen open-air museum in Stockholm, an assignment that she held until 31 August 2005, when she was replaced by John Brattmyhr. Leijon was chairman of Moderna Museet from 1999 to 2008.

Personal life
From 1964 to 1970, she was partner of Anders Leion (born 1939). In 1975, she married electrical engineer Leif Backéus (born 1934). She is the mother of Britta Lejon, the former Minister for Democratic Issues in Sweden. Anna-Greta Leijon, her former partner Anders Leion and the daughter Britta Lejon all spell their surnames differently.

Bibliography

See also
Operation Leo

References

External links

1939 births
Living people
Uppsala University alumni
Members of the Riksdag from the Social Democrats
Swedish Ministers for Gender Equality
Women government ministers of Sweden
Female justice ministers
20th-century Swedish women politicians
20th-century Swedish politicians